Ága is a 2018 Bulgarian drama film directed by Milko Lazarov. It was selected as the Bulgarian entry for the Best International Feature Film at the 92nd Academy Awards, but it was not nominated.

Plot
After his wife Sedna passes away, Nanook sets out to find their daughter Ága who ran away long ago.

Cast
 Mikhail Aprosimov as Nanook
 Feodosia Ivanova as Sedna
 Sergei Egorov as Chena

See also
 List of submissions to the 92nd Academy Awards for Best International Feature Film
 List of Bulgarian submissions for the Academy Award for Best International Feature Film

References

External links
 

2018 films
2018 drama films
Yakut-language films
Bulgarian drama films
Films set in Siberia